Samuel Winter Cooke (13 March 1847 – 26 June 1929) was an Australian politician.

Early life

Cooke was the son of pastoralist Cecil Pybus Cooke and Arbella, née Winter. He was sent to England for his schooling, where he attended Mr Shapcott's school and Cheltenham College, subsequently taking a Bachelor of Arts at Trinity College, Cambridge in 1870. He was called to the Bar in 1872, and returned to Victoria in 1873, where he also briefly practiced law.

He inherited a  property near Hamilton from his uncle Samuel Pratt Winter, where he bred cattle and horses. He became well known in the district as an aristocratic and imperialist man, but gained a reputation as a host. He also became prominent in racing, presiding over the Pastoral and Agricultural Society, Race Club and Hunt, and the Melbourne Club in 1896.

Politics

A Portland Shire councillor from 1879–85, he was elected to the Victorian Legislative Council in 1888. He was minister without portfolio from 1893–94, and acted briefly as minister for education and defence. In the first federal election, Cooke was elected as a Free Trade Party member for the seat of Wannon. He sat until 1903, when he resigned to go overseas; he stood again, unsuccessfully, in 1910. He notably supported imperialism, free trade and the White Australia policy while in parliament, and was also an opponent of women's suffrage.

Cooke had married Alice Margaret Werge Chambers at St Kilda on 6 January 1883; after her death in 1903, he married her cousin Margaret Hawdon at Tahara on 6 July 1910. He died childless on 26 June 1929 at London.

References

 

1847 births
1929 deaths
Free Trade Party members of the Parliament of Australia
Members of the Australian House of Representatives
Members of the Australian House of Representatives for Wannon
Members of the Victorian Legislative Council
20th-century Australian politicians
Australian barristers